Roy Joseph Horstmann (December 6, 1910 – January 23, 1998) was an American football running back in the National Football League for the Boston Redskins and Chicago Cardinals.  He played college football at Purdue University. While at Purdue, Horstmann was a brother at Theta Tau fraternity (Roll Number: Phi 097).

1910 births
1998 deaths
Sportspeople from Aurora, Illinois
American football running backs
Boston Redskins players
Chicago Cardinals players
Purdue Boilermakers football players